The 2011 Montreux Volley Masters was held in Montreux, Switzerland between 7–12 June 2011. Eight teams participated in this tournament.

Participating teams

Group stage

Group A

Table

|}

Results

|}

Group B

Table

|}

Results

|}

Classification round

5th–8th place

|}

5th place match

|}

Final round

Semifinals

  
|}

3rd place match

|}

Final

|}

Final standings

Awards
 MVP:  Hitomi Nakamichi
 Best Scorer:  Christiane Fürst
 Best Spiker:  Yukiko Ebata 
 Best Blocker:  Christiane Fürst 
 Best Setter:  Elena Keldibekova 
 Best Server:  Nana Iwasaka 
 Best Receiver:  Janneke van Tienen 
 Best Libero:  Janneke van Tienen

References

External links
 Official Page of 2011 Montreux Volley Masters

Montreux Volley Masters
Montreux Volley Masters
Montreux Volley Masters